al-Hajaliah is a village in northern Aleppo Governorate, northern Syria.

With 574 inhabitants, as per the 2004 census, al-Hajaliah administratively belongs to Nahiya Jarabulus within Jarabulus District. Besides Jarabulus, nearby localities further include al-Haluwaniyah  to the southwest, and Tall Shair  to the south.

References

Populated places in Syria